Finsler's lemma is a mathematical result named after Paul Finsler.  It states equivalent ways to express the positive definiteness of a quadratic form Q constrained by a linear form L. 
Since it is equivalent to another lemmas used in optimization and control theory, such as Yakubovich's S-lemma, Finsler's lemma has been given many proofs and has been widely used, particularly in results related to robust optimization and linear matrix inequalities.

Statement of Finsler's lemma 

The following statements are equivalent:

Variants 
The following statements, which are also referred as Finsler's lemma in the literature, are equivalent:

 
 
 
 
There is also a variant of Finsler's lemma for quadratic matrix inequalities, known as matrix Finsler's lemma, which states that the following statements are equivalent for symmetric matrices Q and L belonging to R(l+k)x(l+k):

 
 

under the assumption that 

 and 

satisfy the following assumptions:

 Q12 = 0 and Q22 < 0,
 L22 < 0, and L11 - L12L22+L12 = 0, and
 there exists a matrix G such that Q11 + GTQ22G > 0 and L22G = L12T.

Generalizations

Projection lemma 

The following statement, known as Projection Lemma (or also as Elimination Lemma), is common on the literature of linear matrix inequalities:
  
 
This can be seen as a generalization of one of Finsler's lemma variants with the inclusion of an extra matrix and an extra constraint.

Robust version 
Finsler's lemma also generalizes for matrices Q and B depending on a parameter s within a set S. In this case, it is natural to ask if the same variable μ (respectively X) can satisfy  for all  (respectively). If Q and B depends continuously on the parameter s, and S is compact, then this is true. If S is not compact, but Q and B are still continuous matrix-valued functions, then μ and X can be guaranteed to be at least continuous functions.

Applications

Data-driven control 
The matrix variant of Finsler lemma has been applied to the data-driven control of Lur'e systems and in a data-driven robust linear matrix inequality-based model predictive control scheme.

S-Variable approach to robust control of linear dynamical systems 
Finsler's lemma can be used to give novel linear matrix inequality (LMI) characterizations to stability and control problems. The set of LMIs stemmed from this procedure yields less conservative results when applied to control problems where the system matrices has dependence on a parameter, such as robust control problems and control of linear-parameter varying systems. This approach has recently been called as S-variable approach and the LMIs stemming from this approach are known as SV-LMIs (also known as dilated LMIs).

Sufficient condition for universal stabilizability of non-linear systems 
A nonlinear system has the universal stabilizability property if every forward-complete solution of a system can be globally stabilized. By the use of Finsler's lemma, it is possible to derive a sufficient condition for universal stabilizability in terms of a differential linear matrix inequality.

See also 
 Linear matrix inequality
 S-lemma
 Elimination lemma

References 

Lemmas